China competed at the 2019 World Aquatics Championships in Gwangju, South Korea from 12 to 28 July 2019.

Medalists

Artistic swimming

China's artistic swimming team consisted of 14 athletes (13 female and 1 male).

Women

Mixed

 Legend: (R) = Reserve Athlete

Diving 

Men

Women

Mixed

 Legend: DNS = Did not start

Open water swimming

China qualified six male and six female open water swimmers.

Men

Women

Mixed

Swimming 

Men

Women

Mixed

 Legend: (*) = Swimmers who participated in the heat only.

Water polo

Women's tournament

Team roster

Peng Lin
Wang Xinyan (C)
Mei Xiaohan
Xiong Dunhan
Niu Guannan
Guo Ning
Wang Huan
Zhang Cong
Zhao Zihan
Zhang Danyi
Chen Xiao
Zhang Jing
Dong Wenxin
Coach: Gong Dali

Group D

Playoffs

9th–12th place semifinals

Eleventh place game

References

World Aquatics Championships
2019
Nations at the 2019 World Aquatics Championships